Below is a list of stations on the BRT network in Rio de Janeiro, Brazil. The BRT Rio network consists of three operational bus rapid transit corridors, Transoeste, Transcarioca and Transolímpica.

Services
Services are a mix of non-stop, limited stops, express, and all stops (Portuguese:direto, semi-direto, expresso, parador). Stations are categorised by their level of service. Terminals are served by most passing buses. Express stations are served by many limited stop and express services as well as all-stop services. All-stop stations are generally only served by buses stopping at all stops. While there are clearly defined corridors, many services cross from one corridor to another. For example, while  is located on the Transoeste corridor, it also receives services from Transcarioca and Transolímpica.

Stations

References

BRT (Rio de Janeiro)